Leon Evan Stickle (born April 20, 1948) is a Canadian former National Hockey League linesman. His officiating career started in 1969 and ended in 1998.

Early life
Stickle is the son of Ivan Stickle and his wife Bernice, and has a sister Gail. Born in Toronto in 1948, Stickle and his sister and parents moved to Milton, Ontario in 1958.
Stickle played baseball for the Milton Red Sox in the Halton County Intermediate League, and also for the Milton Midgets in 1964.
After playing for the Sarnia Jr. B Legionnaires, Leon played hockey for his hometown Milton Merchant Juniors, a O.H.A Central Junior C team coached by Milton's first NHL player Enio Sclisizzi in 1965-66 and 1966-67. He led the team in scoring at one point in 1965.
Stickle was also a snooker player, having won a local championship in 1966.

Officiating career
Stickle's first NHL game was October 17, 1970. During his career (in which he wore a helmet from the mid-1980s until his retirement), he officiated six Stanley Cup finals (1977, 1978, 1980, 1981, 1984 and 1985), 2,069 regular season games, 206 playoff games, two Canada Cups (1981 and 1984), and four All-Star games, including the 1979 Challenge Cup and Rendez-vous '87. From the 1994-95 season until his retirement, he wore uniform number 33.

Controversy
On May 24, 1980 the New York Islanders won the first of four-straight Stanley Cups. Philadelphia Flyers fans argue they saw an offside that wasn't called, and possibly another, robbing the Flyers of the chance to win Game 6 which would have tied the series and sent the teams to Philadelphia for a seventh and deciding game. If linesman Leon Stickle had blown his whistle in the first period and then again in overtime on goals that would have undoubtedly been contested; had there been a coach’s challenge, and the Flyers had instead won that day, a Game 7 would have been played at the Spectrum, which the Flyers may have won.

The initial non-call occurred in the first period when the Islanders went ahead on a 2-1 goal by Duane Sutter. After the game Stickle admitted he missed the call and that the replay shows that the Clark Gillies drop pass to Butch Goring was offside. Then in overtime on Bob Nystrom’s goal, it’s close enough that it would have merited a long video review and might have been overturned under present-day rules.

Post Linesman Career
After a 27-year career patrolling the blue lines, Stickle joined the Western Professional Hockey League, where he spent three seasons as supervisor of officials before being named director of officiating in July 2000. In 2003, Stickle was hired as the NHL's supervisor of officials. Stickle left his job at the time as director of hockey operations for the Central Hockey League. Stickle spent 27 seasons as a linesman in the NHL before moving to the CHL.

Awards
In 2007, Stickle was inducted in the inaugural class of the Milton Walk of Fame. In 2019, the Milton Sports Hall of Fame announced that Stickle would be inducted as a builder at its annual induction ceremony.

Personal
During the off-season, Stickle was active with the Ontario and Canadian Special Olympics, and coached minor league baseball. He enjoys playing golf. Stickle married Nancy Ellen Smith in 1967, and has three children, two daughters Jayne and Christine and a son David.

References

External links
NHLOA.com bio

 The National Hockey League Official Guide & Record Book/1993-94

1948 births
Living people
National Hockey League officials
Sportspeople from Milton, Ontario
Ice hockey people from Toronto